Born to Dance is an American reality TV show hosted by choreographer Laurieann Gibson. The series will premiere on BET on August 2, 2011.

Overview
The series stars Laurieann Gibson, a world-famous choreographer, and follows 20 aspiring dancers who are competing for the chance to take part in a competition at the end of the series.

Cast

Laurieann Gibson
Richard Jackson
Bethany "Peanut" Strong
Jahleeka “Jelly” Morris

References

External links
 Official Website

African-American reality television series